Baron Harris, of Seringapatam and Mysore in the East Indies and of Belmont in the County of Kent, is a title in the Peerage of the United Kingdom.

The title was created in 1815 for the military commander General Sir George Harris. He gained fame as Commander-in-Chief at the siege and capture of Seringapatam and the conquest of Mysore in India in 1799. He was also injured at the Battle of Bunker Hill in the American Revolutionary War. He was succeeded by his eldest son, the second Baron. He was a Lieutenant-General in the Army. His son, the third Baron, served as Governor of Madras and also held minor office in the second Liberal administration of Lord Palmerston. His son, the fourth Baron, was a Conservative politician and served as Under-Secretary of State for India, Under-Secretary of State for War and Governor of Bombay. Lord Harris was also a successful cricketer.

On the death of his grandson, the sixth Baron, in 1995, the line of the eldest son of the first Baron failed. The late Baron was succeeded by his fourth cousin, the seventh Baron. He was the great-great-grandson of the Hon. Michael Thomas Harris, second son of the first Baron.  the title is held by his son, the eighth Baron, who succeeded in 1996.

The family seat is Belmont House near Faversham in Kent.

Barons Harris (1815)
George Harris, 1st Baron Harris (1746–1829)
William George Harris, 2nd Baron Harris (1782–1845)
George Francis Robert Harris, 3rd Baron Harris (1810–1872)
George Robert Canning Harris, 4th Baron Harris (1851–1932)
George St Vincent Harris, 5th Baron Harris (1889–1984)
George Robert John Harris, 6th Baron Harris (1920–1995)
Derek Marshall Harris, 7th Baron Harris (1916–1996)
Anthony Thomas Scott Harris, 8th Baron Harris (born 1942)

The heir presumptive is the present holder's fourth cousin Rear-Admiral Michael George Temple Harris (born 1941). Like the present holder, he is a great-great-great grandson of the second son of the first Baron.
The heir presumptive's heir presumptive is his brother, John Frank Temple Harris (born 1944).

Male-line family tree

Line of succession

  George Harris, 1st Baron Harris (1746–1829)
  William George Harris, 2nd Baron Harris (1782–1845)
  George Francis Robert Harris, 3rd Baron Harris (1810–1872)
  George Robert Canning Harris, 4th Baron Harris (1851–1932)
  George St Vincent Harris, 5th Baron Harris (1889–1984)
  George Robert John Harris, 6th Baron Harris (1920–1995)
 Hon. Michael Thomas Harris (1783–1824)
 Thomas Inglis Parish Harris (1811–1867)
 Lt. Col. Thomas Harris (1845–1918)
 Major Thomas Guy Marriott Harris (1882–1955)
  Derek Marshall Harris Harris, 7th Baron Harris (1916–1996)
  Anthony Thomas Scott Harris, 8th Baron Harris (born 1942)
 George Anstruther Harris (1812–1891)
 George Lucian Taylor Harris (1836–1903)
 George Temple James Harris (1876–1929)
 Antony John Temple Harris (1915–2002)
 (1) R. Adm. Michael George Temple Harris (born 1941)
 (2) John Frank Temple Harris (born 1944)
 Hermann Gundert Harris (1859–1950)
 George Rutherford Harris (1903–1983)
 (3) Gerald Rutherford Harris (born 1928)
 (4) Scott Harris (born 1960)
 (5) Alfred James Harris (born 1942)
 (6) Dwayne Stephen Harris (born 1966)
 Alfred Herschel Harris (1863–1953)
 Christopher Money Harris (1907–1997)
 (7) Robert Julian Brownlow Harris (born 1943)

Arms

References

Works cited

External links
 Belmont House

Baronies in the Peerage of the United Kingdom
Noble titles created in 1815